The 2001 Canadian Grand Prix (formally the Grand Prix Air Canada 2001) was a Formula One motor race held on 10 June 2001 at the Circuit Gilles Villeneuve in Montreal, Quebec in front of a crowd of 111,000 people. It was the eighth round of the 2001 Formula One season and the 33rd Canadian Grand Prix as part of the Formula One World Championship. The 69-lap race was won by Williams driver Ralf Schumacher after starting from the second position. Michael Schumacher finished second in a Ferrari and McLaren driver Mika Häkkinen came third.

Michael Schumacher won the thirty-eighth pole position of his career by posting the fastest lap in qualifying and he maintained his lead going into the first corner. He opened up his lead to 1.1 seconds until Ralf Schumacher's tyres reached their optimum operating temperatures and he lowered his advantage to four-tenths of a second until a safety car was required on lap twenty for separate accidents for Rubens Barrichello and Juan Pablo Montoya. It was on track for the next three laps although Michael Schumacher extended his lead once again at the restart, Ralf Schumacher again reduced it as he sought his way past on the track but he did so after the pit stop cycle on lap fifty-one. Ralf Schumacher held the lead for the last eighteen laps to claim his second victory of the season and it marked the first time siblings had finished first and second in Formula One.

The result of the race meant Michael Schumacher increased his lead at the top of the Drivers' Championship to eighteen points ahead of David Coulthard who retired due to an engine failure in the final fifteen laps of the race. Barrichello maintained third position despite his crash, Ralf Schumacher stayed in fourth and Häkkinen rounded out the top five. Ferrari increased their advantage over McLaren in the Constructors' Championship to 38 points and Williams retained third with nine rounds left in the season.

Background
The 2001 Canadian Grand Prix was the eighth of seventeen scheduled races of the 2001 Formula One World Championship and the thirty-third edition of the event as part of the Formula One World Championship. It was held on 10 June at the  thirteen-turn Circuit Gilles Villeneuve in Montreal, Quebec. Going into the eighth round of the season, Ferrari driver Michael Schumacher led the Drivers' Championship with 52 points, ahead of his nearest championship rival David Coulthard of McLaren (40) and Rubens Barrichello in the second Ferrari (24). Williams' Ralf Schumacher was in fourth on twelve points and Nick Heidfeld of Sauber was fifth with eight points. Ferrari led the Constructors' Championship with 76 points; McLaren and Williams were second and third with 44 and 18 points respectively. Jordan with 13 points and Sauber with twelve contended for fourth place in the standings.

Michael Schumacher had won the Canadian Grand Prix four times in his career up until the 2001 race and spoke of his confidence that he could win at the Circuit Gilles Villeneuve for the fifth time despite his dislike of the track due to his preference of high-speed corners, "The records I have in Montreal are good but that means nothing now as it is a new challenge. We need to be prepared to do a good job. It will be a tight competition between us and probably McLaren and Williams, and anyone else who has improved a lot." His brother Ralf Schumacher stated that he hoped to extend his points tally after a poor performance at the preceding Monaco Grand Prix, "I think the Circuit Giles Villeneuve could be pretty favourable to our car as we have a powerful engine, which is essential there. It's not particularly demanding on the drivers, as it is basically a "stop-and-go" track. I like Montreal and I am looking forward to being there, hoping this time I will be able to finish my race and be in the points."

Practice
Four practice sessions were held before the Sunday race—two on Friday, and two on Saturday. The Friday morning and afternoon sessions each lasted an hour. The third and final practice sessions were held on Saturday morning and lasted 45 minutes. Conditions were dry and sunny for the Friday practice sessions. Coulthard was fastest in the first practice session with a time of one minute and 18.763 seconds, almost four-tenths of a second faster than Barrichello in second. His teammate Michael Schumacher was third and was fastest before Coulthard's and Barrichello's late session laps. Mika Häkkinen, Olivier Panis, Heidfeld, Jarno Trulli, Kimi Räikkönen, Ralf Schumacher and Juan Pablo Montoya rounded out the session's top ten drivers. Jacques Villeneuve lost the rear of his BAR leaving turn five and struck the barriers lining the circuit at the next corner, heavily damaging his car which rested upon a tyre wall. Villeneuve was unhurt but he was forced to miss the remainder of the session. This came after Villeneuve drove behind Montoya and overtook him before stopping in front of him heading into the L'Epingle hairpin. Montoya spoke of his feeling that Villeneuve had "brake-tested" him but Villeneuve blamed Montoya. In the second practice session, Häkkinen set the fastest lap of the day with the only time under the one minute and 18 seconds range at one minute and 17.692 seconds, followed by his teammate Coulthard, Eddie Irvine, Barrichello, Montoya, Ralf Schumacher, Heidfeld, Trulli, Heinz-Harald Frentzen and Panis.

At the drivers' briefing later on Friday, Montoya reportedly threatened to place Villeneuve in the wall and Villeneuve responded by saying he would put Montoya in a tree. Montoya then told Villeneuve that he "killed" marshal Graham Beveridge in a crash at the season-opening Australian Grand Prix three months earlier. His remark prompted Villeneuve to grab Montoya by the collar on his racing overalls in an attempt to choke him, causing Fédération Internationale de l'Automobile (FIA) race director Charlie Whiting to intervene to stop the altercation. Both drivers were later summoned into a meeting where Whiting warned them that they would face a ban of two races in the event of future altercations. After a heavy accident with the tyre barrier at turn three in the second practice session that measured at 19 g, Frentzen complained of double vision and headaches and he withdrew from the race to travel to a clinic in Nice for tests to his vision and balance. His car was taken over by Jordan test and reserve driver Ricardo Zonta for the remainder of the weekend after the stewards granted Jordan's request under the Formula One Sporting Code.

Weather conditions remained dry and clear for the Saturday practice sessions. Häkkinen paced the third practice session with a time of one minute and 16.628 seconds. His teammate Coulthard was 0.047 seconds slower in second and Michael Schumacher was third. Barrichello in the second Ferrari car was fourth, Ralf Schumacher placed fifth and Irvine sixth. Heidfeld, Pedro de la Rosa, Räikkönen and Panis filled positions seven through ten. In the final practice session, Michael Schumacher was fastest with a one-minute and 16.200 seconds lap. Coulthard in the faster of the two McLarens came second and his teammate Häkkinen was third. Fourth place went to Barrichello while the Sauber duo of Heidfeld and Räikkönen placed fifth and sixth. Panis was seventh-fastest, Ralf Schumacher eighth, Trulli and de la Rosa completed the top ten ahead of qualifying. Zonta's brakes snatched away and he ran into the gravel trap beside the circuit sixteen minutes into practice and Jean Alesi spun and stalled his car twenty minutes later.

Qualifying

Saturday's afternoon one hour qualifying session saw each driver was limited to twelve laps, with the grid order decided by their fastest laps. During this session, the 107% rule was in effect, which necessitated each driver to set a time within 107 per cent of the quickest lap to qualify for the race. Conditions were warm and clear for qualifying. Michael Schumacher took the thirty-eighth pole position of his career with a one-minute and 15.782 seconds lap that he set with twelve minutes remaining. He was joined on the grid's front row by Ralf Schumacher who set a time 0.515 seconds slower than his brother after heavily altering his car's set-up. Coulthard ran wide at the final chicane during his first timed lap but improved in the final sector on his last try for third. Fourth-placed Trulli was ordered to parc fermé at the entry of the pit lane and he felt it prevented him from bettering his time due to the long amount of time he was kept there by marshals. Barrichello qualified fifth but he was the cause of the first red flag when he launched over the kerbing at the final chicane and hit the Wall of Champions sideways with the right-hand side of his vehicle. He was unhurt and he drove the spare Ferrari F2001 optimised for his teammate Michael Schumacher. Panis took sixth and Räikkönen understeered on the run into the L'Epingle hairpin and narrowly avoided the Wall of Champions after going airborne over the kerbs at the final turn. Häkkinen switched to the spare McLaren MP4-16 optimised for his teammate Coulthard after damaging his main car's right-hand side radiator and undertray by launching over the high kerb at the final corner but a misfiring engine restricted him to eighth. Villeneuve and Montoya rounded out the top ten qualifiers.

Heidfeld was the fastest competitor not to qualify in the top ten because his best lap time was 1.383 seconds slower than Michael Schumacher's pole lap and Heidfeld triggered the second stoppage with two minutes to go when he crashed heavily at the final chicane and his car's monocoque was rebuilt for the race. Zonta achieved his team principal Eddie Jordan's prediction qualifying twelfth and made a driving error on the approach to the first corner. Jos Verstappen begun from thirteenth. The Jaguar pair of de la Rosa and Irvine placed fourteenth and fifteenth and the former slowed and he was almost hit by Irvine leaving the final chicane. Alesi had brake instability and a lack of traction en route to sixteenth and his Prost teammate Luciano Burti could not optimise his car's handling for nineteenth. On his maiden appearance at the circuit, Enrique Bernoldi qualified seventeenth and Giancarlo Fisichella took eighteenth in the faster of the two Benettons as he picked up a large amount of understeer due to changes in the track surface and changed his car's downforce for better straightline speed. Jenson Button had an excessive amount of understeer and he took twentieth. The Minardis of Fernando Alonso and Tarso Marques occupied the final row of the grid in twenty-first and twenty-second.

Qualifying classification

Notes
  — Fernando Alonso was excluded from qualifying due to an illegal front wing.

Warm-up
The drivers took to the track on Sunday morning for a half an hour warm-up session to fine tune their cars in warm and clear conditions. Panis ran faster than he had done during the weekend with the session's fastest lap of one minute and 18.512 seconds. Coulthard was the faster of the two McLarens in second and his teammate Häkkinen set the fifth fastest-time after the team rebuilt his car overnight. They were separated by Zonta and Irvine in third and fourth places. Schumacher was the sixth-fastest driver in the time sheets and concentrated on assessing two versions of front wings for his vehicle and car set-up for the race.

Race
The race began at 13:00 Eastern Standard Time (UTC+05:00). Weather conditions at the start were clear and dry. A record crowd of 111,000 spectators attended the event. Engine stress and fuel consumption were the two main factors for the Grand Prix as the optimum strategy was one of a solitary pit stop. However, a driver in a lightly fuelled car could have an advantage over his rivals and this often resulted in less stress being put on the brakes. Michael Schumacher made a good start to hold the first position from Ralf Schumacher on the inside line going into the first corner. Coulthard in third place was heavily fuelled for a one-stop strategy and he led a close pack of cars. Verstappen was lightly fuelled and he gained seven places to move into seventh, while Zonta moved from twelfth to ninth. Barrichello overtook Trulli for fourth later in the lap. Further back in the field, Fisichella ran into the rear of Bernoldi's slower car at the L'Epingle hairpin and damaged the front wing on his car. Then, on the back straight, Button steered to the left to avoid striking Bernoldi but doing this meant his teammate Fisichella drove into the rear of his car.

At the end of the first lap, Michael Schumacher led Ralf Schumacher by three-tenths of a second. Following another six-tenths of a second in arrears was Coulthard and the rest of the order was Barrichello, Trulli, Panis, Verstappen, Räikkönen, Zonta, Häkkinen, Montoya, Heidfeld, Irvine, de la Rosa, Villeneuve, Bernoldi, Marques, Button, Alesi, Alonso and Burti. Fisichella's right-front suspension was broken and he drove into the pit lane to retire. On lap two, Irvine made contact with one of Heidfeld's rear tyres going into turn three and both drivers spun into the grass. Both drivers retired from the race because of the amount of damage to their cars. Marques was passed by Button for fifteenth on the same lap. Barrichello slipstreamed Coulthard and he overtook him around the inside for third at the end of the third lap. That same lap, Ralf Schumacher set the fastest lap of the race at that point at one minute and 20.797 seconds, until Barrichello bettered it by eight-tenths of a second on lap four to draw closer to him. In the meantime, Marques fell behind Alesi and Alonso. By the start of lap five, Michael Schumacher established a lead of a 1.1 seconds over Ralf Schumacher who was still being put under pressure by Barrichello.

Barrichello switched off his traction control system two laps earlier because it caused his engine to misfire. On the sixth lap, the lack of traction control caused Barrichello to lose control of his car and spin leaving the L'Epingle chicane. He fell to fourteenth and his spin Coulthard returned to third place. Burti got ahead of Marques for nineteenth on that lap. Button was issued a ten-second stop-and-go penalty on lap seven because he was adjudged to have jumped the start. He took the penalty on the next lap. Alonso pulled off to the side of the circuit in the third sector with a broken driveshaft CV joint on lap eight. Bernoldi made the first pit stop of the Grand Prix on the ninth lap per the instruction of his team to remove a paper bag from his radiator to stop his engine from overheating. On the eleventh and twelve laps, Barrichello got past Villeneuve and de la Rosa to move into eleventh. At the front of the field, Ralf Schumacher lowered Michael Schumacher's advantage to less than a second when his tyres reached their optimum operating temperatures and he further reduced his brother's lead to four-tenths of a second on lap fifteen. He continued to push hard to remain close by Michael Schumacher, hoping the latter would make a driver error. Button retired in the pit lane with an oil leak on lap 18.

The safety car was deployed on lap twenty when Montoya lost control of the rear of his car over a kerb and crashed into the wall at turn four alongside the circuit. Barrichello was close behind Montoya and his attempt to swerve to avoid hitting his car caused him to oversteer into the inside barrier after appearing to lock his brakes heavily. The safety car was withdrawn at the end of lap 23 and Michael Schumacher maintained his lead over Ralf Schumacher at the rolling restart. Michael Schumacher opened out a lead of 2.6 seconds over Ralf Schumacher who could not match his pace due to extra tyre rubber he picked up under the safety car. Bernoldi retired on lap 25 because of an overheating engine. The following lap, Verstappen passed Marques for thirteenth. De La Rosa attempted to overtake Häkkinen for eighth on the approach to the final corner on lap 27 but Häkkinen repelled the manoeuvre. Ralf Schumacher reduced Michael Schumacher's lead to one-and-a-half seconds by lap thirty and he further lowered it to 0.521 seconds two laps later. Further back on lap 34, Zonta and Räikkönen made contact on the back straight but both drivers continued without major damage to their cars. That same lap, Villeneuve retired with a broken driveshaft after having earlier problems with his brakes.

On lap 35 Ralf Schumacher tried to overtake Michael Schumacher on the inside line but he backed out of the manoeuvre at the chicane. Häkkinen overtook Zonta for seventh on the same lap. The following lap, Ralf Schumacher again tried to pass Michael Schumacher but this time by going around the outside of him and was unsuccessful. Häkkinen gained another position when he overtook his fellow Finnish driver Räikkönen entering turn ten for sixth. Panis retired on lap 38 from a long brake pedal that prevented him from stopping his car. Green flag pit stops for tyres and fuel began that lap when Trulli entered the pit lane. Räikkönen and Alesi made pit stops over laps thirty-nine and forty-one. In the meantime, Ralf Schumacher twice tried to overtake Michael Schumacher but he was unsuccessful on both attempts. Just as his teammate Häkkinen was about to pass, Coulthard made his pit stop from third on lap 42. Michael Schumacher made his pit stop four laps later, handing the lead to Ralf Schumacher who increased his pace in his attempt to get ahead of his brother after his own stop by lowering the race track lap record three times. He entered the pit lane at the end of lap fifty-one and emerged 6.4 seconds in front of Michael Schumacher.

Four laps later, Coulthard's engine failed on the back straight because of rising water temperatures, curtailing his race. Trulli was afflicted by a brake hydraulic problem which caused his pace to lower and he was overtaken by Räikkönen, Alesi and Verstappen between laps 62 and 63. He drove into the pit lane on lap 64 to retire. Two laps later, Verstappen spun into the barrier due to a failure of his front brakes and was the final retirement of the Grand Prix. Unhindered in the final 15 laps, Ralf Schumacher increased his lead to more than twenty seconds and he crossed the start/finish line after 69 laps to claim the second victory of the season and of his career after his maiden win at the San Marino Grand Prix two months earlier. Michael Schumacher finished in second, achieving the first one-two finish for siblings in the history of Formula One. Häkkinen completed the podium in third. Off the podium, Räikkönen took fourth, Alesi fifth and de la Rosa completed the point-scoring finishers. in sixth. The Brazilian trio of Zonta, Burti and Marques were the final finishers.

Post-race 
The top three drivers appeared on the podium to collect their trophies and spoke to the media in a later press conference. Ralf Schumacher said that he and his brother had not competed against each other competitively in go-kart racing and that the Montréal was the first time of doing so, "It was obviously a great race today. The whole time the two of us together I was waiting for him to make a mistake. Obviously he didn't. I tried it a couple of times at the end of the straight but then it was difficult, so I waited for the pit strategy when I thought that we would go longer anyway and it worked out that way." Michael Schumacher spoke of a "happy family day" and stated that he was aware his brother was experienced enough not to make a driving error, "He obviously was close to overtaking but when you're inside, basically you have to brake a little bit earlier to make the corner and I was braking very late to try the maximum and as he said, he was going longer than I was, so I understand that he didn't take the maximum risk for either of us. It worked out for him." Häkkinen revealed that McLaren's objective was to finish in the top three but lamented that he could not get into the slipstream of the cars ahead of him due to the lack of acceleration from his car leaving the L'Epingle hairpin.

Frank Williams, owner of the Williams team, commented that he felt Ralf Schumacher's victory demonstrated that the driver as much as skill as his brother and Häkkinen, "Ralf is a natural winner who is going to get better and better and he gets older and more experienced. I remember telling people in the middle of 1999 that if Ralf was in a winning car, a Ferrari or a McLaren, he would already have won races. His manner of winning was exemplary." Although his engine failed, Coulthard was still confident of reducing the lead of Michael Schumacher in the Drivers' Championship over the rest of the season, "It (the title) is still achievable. But I can only do what I can do. Walking on water isn't something I've mastered yet. I think Ferrari still have a bit of a qualifying advantage because they use their tyres better but I still think we have a strong race car. I still believe I can win Grands Prix and be a challenge to Michael." Button and Fischella apologised to each other following their collision on the first lap of the Grand Prix and the technical director of Benetton Mike Gascoyne insisted that neither driver was to blame.

The result of the race meant Michael Schumacher maintained his lead at the top of the Drivers' Championship with 58 points. Coulthard was still in second but his retirement meant Schumacher increased his lead to eighteen points and Barrichello kept the third position. Ralf Schumacher stayed in the fourth position despite his victory and Häkkinen's podium finish allowed him to advance into fifth place in the standings. In the Constructors' Championship, Ferrari increased their advantage over McLaren to thirty-six points. Williams maintained third with 28 points. Sauber moved past their rivals Jordan in the battle for fourth place with nine rounds left in the season. At the FIA Prize Giving Ceremony in Monte Carlo on 15 December, the organiser of the Canadian Grand Prix, Normand Legault was awarded the prize of Best Promoter.

Race classification
Drivers who scored championship points are denoted in bold.

Notes 
 Marcel Fässler replaced the injured Bernd Mayländer as the safety car driver. He also worked as a successor in Monaco.

Championship standings after the race

Drivers' Championship standings

Constructors' Championship standings

 Note: Only the top five positions are included for both sets of standings.

References

External links
 

Canadian Grand Prix
Canadian Grand Prix
Grand Prix
2000s in Montreal
2001 in Quebec
Grand Prix